In baseball, a position player is a player who on defense plays as an infielder, outfielder, or catcher. In Major League Baseball (since 1973 in the American League and since 2022 in the National League), there is also a designated hitter, who bats but does not play any defensive positions (and is therefore not a position player). Position players are eligible to pitch, and a manager will use a position player as a relief pitcher on rare occasions. This typically happens if a game is a blowout, if no other pitchers are available, or if the game has gone well into extra innings. Although a position player may be eligible to pitch, the pitcher is not considered a position player.

In other sports
In ice hockey, "position player" refers to all non-goaltender players (forwards and defencemen), although "skater" is the more common term.

See also
 Baseball positions

References

Baseball positions
Ice hockey positions
Ice hockey terminology